The Other Side of the Door is a 2016 supernatural horror film directed by Johannes Roberts and co-written by Roberts and Ernest Riera. Starring Sarah Wayne Callies, Jeremy Sisto, Javier Botet, and Sofia Rosinsky, the film was released in the United Kingdom and the United States on 4 March 2016.  The film grossed over $14 million worldwide from a $5 million budget.

Plot
After losing her son Oliver, who drowned in a car accident in India, Maria Harwood has not recovered from the tragedy. During the accident, Maria chose to save her youngest daughter, Lucy, instead of Oliver because Oliver's leg was stuck and she was unable to free it. Maria is consumed by her guilt ever since. One night, her husband Michael finds Maria unconscious after a suicide attempt. In the hospital, Maria is comforted by her housekeeper Piki. Piki asks Maria if she wants one final chance to say goodbye to Oliver. Piki explains that she has been in a similar position and predicament, where she lost her daughter in a drowning incident due to not paying attention. According to Piki, there is an abandoned temple in her hometown where the line between the living and the dead is very thin. Maria must scatter her son's ashes at the temple steps and lock herself in. Oliver will speak to her once night falls. However, no matter what Oliver says, Maria must not open the temple door for him. Maria agrees and the pair have Oliver's body exhumed and burned. Maria notices some strange men covered in ash. Piki explains that they are shamans who consume the flesh of the dead and coat themselves in ash to strengthen their bonds between the worlds of the living and the dead.

The next day Maria arrives at the temple and follows Piki's instructions. Inside, she uncovers a mummified corpse of a woman. Night falls and Oliver begins talking to Maria, who apologizes to Oliver for leaving him. Oliver starts pleading with Maria to open the door but she explains that she cannot do that. When Oliver says he has to leave Maria panics wanting more time and opens the door, but sees no one. She returns home the next day; now having closure, she focuses her attention on Michael and Lucy but doesn't tell Piki that she opened the door. Strange things start happening; their piano plays itself and Lucy tells Maria that Oliver has come back and that he is hiding from someone. Lucy also tells Maria that she should not let Michael know about Oliver's return until Oliver is ready to. In Oliver's room, a chair moves toward her, along with The Jungle Book, which Maria was reading to Oliver when he died, but never finished. Realising Oliver wants her to finish the book, she does so. Piki notices that the nearby plants have started dying and begins to realize that Maria had disobeyed her instructions at the temple.

Later, the decomposed body of Oliver appears near Lucy. Maria discovers a bloody bite mark on her shoulder when giving Lucy a bath. Whereas Lucy was fond of Oliver's return in the past, she tells Maria that she no longer likes Oliver. She enters Oliver's room and tells him that he can't hurt Lucy. Oliver pulls out the chair and book again and Maria starts reading to him as long as he doesn't hurt Lucy. A shaman appears at the house and points behind Maria; she sees the mummified body from the temple behind her, which chases her. The next day, an outraged Piki confronts Maria and explains to her that due to her actions, Oliver's soul cannot be properly reincarnated and has become evil. She reveals to Maria that the strange figure she has been seeing is Myrtu, the gatekeeper of the underworld, who reclaims the soul of the dead. Piki urges Maria to burn all of Oliver's possessions to break his hold on the living world.

While Piki attempts to discard and burn all of Oliver's remaining possessions, Oliver uses the guise of Piki's dead daughter to lure her to a pond and drown her. After Piki's funeral, Michael comes home and discovers Maria has finished burning Oliver's possessions. Distraught and angry, Michael does not believe Maria as she attempts to explain her actions. Reinforcing his mistrust, Lucy suddenly denies any knowledge of Oliver returning. Maria realises that Oliver has possessed Lucy. Michael believes that Maria is becoming mentally unhinged and locks her in a room.

The shamans begin to crowd the house; the possessed Lucy kills the Harwood’s Golden Retriever Winston with a knife and stabs a horrified Michael. Maria breaks out and heads up to Oliver's room where she sees shamans chanting over Lucy's body. Since they cannot remove the spirit from Lucy, they plan to sacrifice her. However, Michael stops them and Maria tells Oliver that he needs to leave. Oliver says he is scared, but Maria says she will go with him. Oliver's spirit leaves Lucy's body and enters Maria's. She charges the shaman with the knife telling him to take her instead. He obliges, fatally stabbing her. She falls and awakens in the room alone. Myrtu appears and takes Maria to the afterlife.

Maria then wakes up and briefly believes that she is alive. She hears Michael's voice call out for her. She sees the temple steps and realises Michael is attempting the same ritual to bring back Maria as she did with Oliver. Maria screams for him not to open the door, and the terror repeats itself again.

Cast
 Sarah Wayne Callies as Maria Harwood, a wife and mother mourning the drowning death of her son. 
 Jeremy Sisto as Michael Harwood, Maria's husband.
 Sofia Rosinsky as Lucy Harwood, Maria and Michael's daughter and Oliver's younger sister.
 Logan Creran as Oliver Harwood, Maria and Michael's deceased son, Lucy's older brother.
 Jax Malcolm as the voice of Oliver.
 Suchitra Pillai as Piki, the Harwoods' live-in housekeeper and nanny. 
 Javier Botet as Myrtu, the gatekeeper of the underworld.

Release
The film was originally scheduled to be released on 26 February 2016. However, the release date was pushed back to 11 March 2016 and then later moved up to 4 March 2016.

Reception

Box office 
The film opened on March 4, 2016 in limited release at only 546 locations where it got $1.2 million opening at No. 16. It grossed $3,000,342 in the United States. The film was a success internationally debuting top five across the world for a total of $14,332,467. In France the film opened at No. 4 and grossed $1,851,016.

Critical response 
On Rotten Tomatoes the film has an approval rating of 36%, based on reviews from 39 critics, with an average rating of 4.60/10. The site's critical consensus reads, "Laden with flimsy jump scares and cheap stereotypes, The Other Side of the Door wastes solid work from Sarah Wayne Callies on thoroughly middling horror fare." On Metacritic the film has a score of 41% based on reviews from 10 critics, indicating "mixed or average reviews".

Christian Holub from Entertainment Weekly gave the film a B+, writing,  "like all the best horror, The Other Side of the Door is concerned not just with what freaks us out on a gut level, but the deeply-repressed anxieties that truly terrify us." Critic Tim Janson, at the SciFi Movie Page gave the film two stars out of five stating the film "is a predictable, by-the-numbers affair which marks no new territory."

Tom Huddleston of Time Out noted how the film panders to seamier representations of India "packed with scowling beggars, scuttling cockroaches, dutiful housemaids and shady shamans" — and that by doing so, the film was ultimately "so tasteless and knee-jerk in its depiction that it makes Indiana Jones and the Temple of Doom look like a triumph of racial awareness." Geoff Berkshire of Variety agreed with that assessment, adding "with a bare minimum of anthropological curiosity ... there’s no interest in mining the setting for anything other than exploitation."

References

External links
 
 
 
 

2016 films
2016 horror films
20th Century Fox films
British supernatural horror films
Indian supernatural horror films
British ghost films
Indian ghost films
Films set in Mumbai
Films shot in Mumbai
2010s supernatural horror films
Films directed by Johannes Roberts
Films scored by Joseph Bishara
Films with screenplays by Johannes Roberts
2010s English-language films
2010s British films
TSG Entertainment films